Aleksandr Aleksandrovich Smirnov (26 April 1958 – 21 July 2021) was a Russian politician. From 2012 to 2016, Smirnov was a member of the 6th convocation of the State Duma, having previously been a vice-governor of Saint Petersburg. He was a member of the Liberal Democratic Party of Russia.

One of Smirnov's assistants reported that he had died aged 63 in Kislovodsk on 21 July 2021, after having contracted COVID-19.

References

1958 births
2021 deaths
Deaths from the COVID-19 pandemic in Russia
Sixth convocation members of the State Duma (Russian Federation)
Liberal Democratic Party of Russia politicians
People from Kokand